Gregory Miller (born 7 May 1973) is a South African cricketer. He played in fourteen first-class and eight List A matches for Eastern Province between 1993/94 and 1995/96.

See also
 List of Eastern Province representative cricketers

References

External links
 

1973 births
Living people
South African cricketers
Eastern Province cricketers
Cricketers from Port Elizabeth